The Vancouver Learning Network (formerly Greater Vancouver Regional Correspondence School) is a public distance education  secondary school headquartered in Vancouver, British Columbia, Canada. It is part of the Vancouver School Board.

VLN is located at the John Oliver Secondary School in Vancouver, BC. It has its own hallway in which it can operate. In this hallway, there is the VLN office, book room, a multi-use classroom and a computer lab.  Students are able to complete their work at one of the 15 computers in the lab.  A resource teacher is present to assist students in all areas of study.  Students may also receive help from their teachers located in the same building.

The school has self-paced online and paper-based courses. All courses are tuition-free to students as long as they are Canadian citizens and residents of British Columbia. A majority of VLN students attend a home secondary school but take one or two classes on VLN.

All courses must be completed within 12 months from the day the student submits the first assignment. A student learning plan (SLP) is created by the students before they begin a class, and must reflect to those timelines.

Ongoing (12 months per year) teacher support and availability, numerous face-to-face requirements, and in-person activities have helped establish VLN as a legitimate and thriving school community. Elluminate sessions are provided as an alternative for students who are unable to attend.

External links
VLN official website

Online schools in Canada
High schools in Vancouver
Educational institutions established in 1990
1990 establishments in British Columbia